John Navarre Macomb Jr., was a United States Army topographical engineer and explorer of the Colorado River. Captain Macomb led the 1859 San Juan Exploring Expedition, whose purpose was to find a military supply route from Santa Fe, New Mexico, to Utah and to map previously unexplored areas along the route. The expedition included the botanist and geologist John Strong Newberry, who made notable scientific observations along the route.

Early life
Macomb was born on 9 April 1811 in New York City, and was the great grandson of Philip Livingston, a signer of the Declaration of Independence. Am 1832 graduate of West Point, he participated in the Black Hawk Expedition. He married a cousin, Czarina Carolina Macomb, in 1838, with whom he had two children. She died in 1846. Macomb remarried in 1850, to Ann Minverva Rodgers ("Nannie"), with whom he had six children. He was promoted to captain in the Corps of Topographical Engineers in 1851 and conducted surveys in the Great Lakes until 1856. That year, he was named chief topographical engineer of the territory of New Mexico.

Macomb Expedition
The Macomb Expedition of 1859 was a consequence of the Utah War, in which the U.S. Army had suffered from serious logistical difficulties. Macomb sought to find a route for military supplies from Santa Fe to central Utah, and also to map the unexplored regions along the route. Though originally political and military in nature, the expedition became "a quintessential scientific endeavor". However, the outbreak of the American Civil War delayed publication of the report of the expedition until 1876, and it has tended to be overshadowed by the great survey expeditions of the post-Civil War period.

American Civil War
Macomb served as a staff officer during the Civil War.

Later life
Macomb died in Washington, D.C., on March 16, 1889.

See also
 Macomb (surname) for some of his near relations

References

United States Army Corps of Engineers personnel
United States Army officers
American explorers
1811 births
1889 deaths